Ernst Leitner (born 27 October 1912, date of death unknown) was an Austrian hurdler. He competed in the men's 110 metres hurdles at the 1936 Summer Olympics.

References

1912 births
Year of death missing
Athletes (track and field) at the 1936 Summer Olympics
Austrian male hurdlers
Olympic athletes of Austria
Place of birth missing